DSA may refer to:

Education
 DeKalb School of the Arts, a grades 8–12 public school in DeKalb County, Georgia, US
 Denver School of the Arts, a grades 6–12 public school in Denver, Colorado, US
 Detroit School of Arts, Michigan, US
 Deutsche Schule Algarve, German school in Silves, Portugal
 Deutsche Schule Athen or German School of Athens, Greece
 Direct School Admission, Singapore
 Disabled students allowance, UK
 Durham School of the Arts, a grades 6–12 public school in Durham, North Carolina, US

Information technology
 Digital Signature Algorithm, a cryptographic standard for digital signatures
 Directory System Agent, an IT standard, part of X.500
 Domain-Specific Architecture, see Pixel Visual Core
 Debian Security Advisory, security advisories for the Debian Linux operating system
 Data structure alignment
 Data structures and algorithms

Organizations
 Defence Safety Authority, UK
 Democratic Socialists of America, a political action organization in the US
 Development Studies Association, UK and Ireland
 Direct Selling Association, the name of several trade associations
 Down's Syndrome Association, a UK charity
 Driving Standards Agency, UK
 DSA Myanmar, Defense Services Academy
 The Dozenal Society of America, advocacy group for the use of a base-12 numeral system

Other
 Daily Subsistence Allowance, a per diem contribution for UNDP staff members
 Das Schwarze Auge role-playing game
 Dental surgery assistant
 Digital Services Act, a name by which the Regulation 2022/2065 is known
 Digital subtraction angiography, a fluoroscopy technique
 Distinguished Service Award (OA), Order of the Arrow, Boy Scouts of America
 Doncaster Sheffield Airport, England (IATA airport code)
 Donor-specific antibody in transplant medicine
 Dubai, Sharjah, Ajman conurbation of emirates in the UAE
 Duluth, South Shore and Atlantic Railway, a former railway company
 Dsa, a rare variant of the humid continental climate with hot, dry summers and cold, wet/snowy winters